Raimon Arola Ferrer (born 1956, in Tarragona), Doctor of Art History and professor at the University of Barcelona, is one of the leading specialists in sacred symbolism, art and Hermetic tradition. He has given numerous seminars in different universities and has collaborated in the journal La Puerta. He is currently the director of Arsgravis and participates in the research group Aula Música Poètica. All of his many publications have international recognition.

Publications 
 (2012) La cábala y la alquimia en la tradición espiritual de Occidente (siglos XV-XVII). Palma de Mallorca: José J. de Olañeta. 
 (2011) El símbolo en la espiritualidad contemporánea.
 (2008) Alquimia y religión. Los símbolos herméticos del siglo XVII. Barcelona: Siruela. 
 (2006) Raimon Arola (ed.). Creer lo increíble. Lo antiguo y lo nuevo en la historia de las religiones. Tarragona: Arolas editors. 
 (2003) El buscador del orden. Tarragona: Arola editors. .
 (1999) Los amores de los dioses. Mitología y alquimia. Barcelona: Altafulla. 
 (1997) El tarot de Mantegna. Barcelona: Altafulla. 
 (1995) Las estatuas vivas. Ensayo sobre arte y simbolismo. Barcelona: Obelisco. 
 (1990) Textos y glosas sobre el arte sagrado. Barcelona: Obelisco. 
 (1986) Simbolismo del templo. Barcelona: Obelisco. 
 (1985) L'arbre, l'home i el tremp. Barcelona: Obelisco.

References 

People from Tarragona
Spanish art historians
Spanish essayists
Spanish male writers
Academic staff of the University of Barcelona
1956 births
Living people
Male essayists